Temporary Marriage is a 1923 American silent drama film directed by Lambert Hillyer and starring Kenneth Harlan, Mildred Davis, and Myrtle Stedman.

Cast
 Kenneth Harlan as Robert Belmar 
 Mildred Davis as Hazel Manners 
 Myrtle Stedman as Mrs. Hugh Manners 
 Tully Marshall as Hugh Manners, a lawyer 
 Maude George as Olga Kazanoff, an adventuress 
 Stuart Holmes as Preston Ducayne, a gambler 
 Edward Coxen as Prosecuting Attorney

References

Bibliography
 Annette M. D'Agostino. Harold Lloyd: A Bio-bibliography. Greenwood Press, 1994.

External links

1923 films
1923 drama films
Silent American drama films
American silent feature films
1920s English-language films
American black-and-white films
Films directed by Lambert Hillyer
1920s American films